We Reach: The Music of the Melvins is a tribute album to the American rock band Melvins, contributed to by a variety of artists. The compilation was released on CD by Fractured Transmitter Recording Company on August 23, 2005.

Track listing

Reception

Alex Henderson of AllMusic gave the tribute album three stars out of five, calling it "slightly uneven". He said that "most of the time, the artists try things that work" and "while We Reach probably won't appeal to those with only a casual interest in the Melvins, it is a lot of fun if one is a hardcore fan of their innovative sludge."

In a review for mxdwn.com, Steve Mangione said: "We Reach: The Music of the Melvins is an amazingly odd assortment of bands taking on over 20 years of material from [Melvins] and incontrovertibly making it work." Speaking on the artists involved, he stated "there’s a number of unknowns on this compilation that certainly hold their own among such big names ... Melvins fans will surely enjoy watching these rising stars of metal pay rightful homage."

References

External Links
We Reach: The Music Of The Melvins at Discogs

Tribute albums
2005 compilation albums